Officially Dead is an EP by the American alternative rock band Veruca Salt, released in 2003 on Embryo.

The single was released in Australia and peaked at #13 on the Triple J top 100

The first pressing of the EP contained many errors. For instance, track #3 is mislabeled; it's actually a demo version of the previously unreleased song "Blissful Queen", rather than the listed "Smoke & Mirrors" demo; for the second pressing, the error was corrected & the 3rd track was the correct "Smoke & Mirrors" demo. Louise Post's friend Summer was not credited for the tattoo on the cover until the second pressing. Also, for the second pressing, a lighter artwork color scheme was used.

Track listing
"Officially Dead" (Tihista/Post) – 2:49
"Straight Jacket" (demo) (Post) – 3:52
"Blissful Queen" (demo) (Post) - 3:44 [First pressing mislabel as "Smoke & Mirrors" (demo)]/"Smoke & Mirrors" (demo) (Post/Fitzpatrick/Crosley) – 3:55 [Correctly labeled on second pressing]
"The Light Behind Your Eyes" (Post) – 2:03
"The Same Person" (Remix) (Post) – 3:51

Personnel
Chad Adams - engineer  
Natalija Brunovs - artwork  
Brian Liesegang - engineer  
Darian Rundall - engineer

References

External links
Veruca Salt's official web site
Veruca Salt at Rolling Stone

2003 EPs
Veruca Salt albums